XMS may refer to:

 Cray XMS, a vector processor minisupercomputer
 eBuddy XMS, instant-messaging service
 ISO 639:xms, Moroccan Sign Language
 Macas Airport (IATA: XMS), Ecuador
 XMS Capital Partners, a global financial services firm
 eXtended Memory Specification, an application programming interface for storing data in extended memory on IBM PC systems
 XMS, an API offered by IBM WebSphere MQ

See also

 
 XM 5 (disambiguation)
 XM (disambiguation)